Giri's geckoella (Cyrtodactylus varadgirii) is a species of gecko, a lizard in the family Gekkonidae. The species is endemic to India.

Etymology
The specific name, varadgirii, is in honour of Indian herpetologist Varad Giri.

Geographic range
C. varadgirii is found in parts of western and central India. It is one of the most widely distributed member of this genus in India, occurring throughout most of the state of Maharashtra and parts of the states of Madhya Pradesh and Gujarat.

Behaviour and habitat
C. varadgirii is nocturnal, insectivorous and terrestrial, living in dense leaf-litter on the forest floor.

Description

Reproduction
C. varadgirii is oviparous.

References

Further reading
Agarwal A, Mirza ZA, Pal S, Maddock ST, Mishra A, Bauer AM (2016). "A new species of the Cyrtodactylus (Geckoella) collegalensis (Beddome, 1870) complex (Squamata: Gekkonidae) from Western India". Zootaxa 4170 (2): 339–354. (Cyrtodactylus varadgirii, new species).

Cyrtodactylus
Reptiles described in 2016